The 2003 ICC Cricket World Cup was the eighth Cricket World Cup, organised by the International Cricket Council (ICC). It was co-hosted by South Africa, Zimbabwe and Kenya from 9 February to 23 March 2003. This edition of the World Cup was the first to be played in Africa.

The tournament featured 14 teams, the largest number in the World Cup's history at the time, playing a total of 54 matches. It followed the format introduced in the 1999 Cricket World Cup, with the teams divided into two groups, and the top three in each group qualifying for the Super Sixes stage.

The tournament saw numerous upsets, with South Africa, Pakistan, West Indies and England all being eliminated at the group stage (South Africa missed by 1 run after misreading the Duckworth-Lewis method rules). England forfeited their match with Zimbabwe, due to the political unrest in the country, which ultimately enabled that team to reach the Super Sixes. Similarly, New Zealand forfeited their match with Kenya, due to security reasons which enabled the latter to reach the semi-finals, the only non-Test playing nation to do so. Another shock wave came two days after the tournament had started, when Shane Warne, at the time one of the game's leading spinners, was sent home in disgrace after testing positive for a banned substance.

The tournament was eventually won by Australia who won all 11 of their matches, beating India in the final played at the Wanderers Stadium in Johannesburg. This was Australia's third World Cup win, the only team to do so. Pakistani player Shoaib Akhtar also set a world record, becoming the fastest bowler in the history of cricket, delivering a record top speed of 161.3km/h (100.23 mph) in a pool match against England.

Teams and squads

Fourteen teams played in the 2003 World Cup, the largest number of teams to play in a Cricket World Cup at the time. The 10 Test playing nations automatically qualified for the tournament including the recently appointed member Bangladesh, while Kenya also qualified automatically due to their full One Day International status. The other three spots were filled by the top three teams in the 2001 ICC Trophy in Canada, which served as a qualifying tournament. These teams were, respectively, the Netherlands who won the ICC Trophy, Canada and Namibia. This was Namibia's World Cup debut, while the Netherlands and Canada were both appearing in the tournament for the second time, having previously appeared in 1996 and 1979 respectively.

The format used in the 1999 World Cup was retained, with the 14 teams divided into two groups of seven, and the top three from each group qualifying for the Super Sixes stage, carrying forward the results they had achieved against other qualifiers from their group. The top four teams in the Super Sixes qualified for the semi-finals, and the winners of those matches contested the final.

Host cities and venues

Group stage
The top three teams from each pool qualify for the next stage, carrying forward the points already scored against fellow qualifiers, plus a quarter of the points scored against the teams that failed to qualify.

Pool A

Source: Points Table

Pool B

Source: Points Table

Super Sixes
Australia, India, Zimbabwe, Sri Lanka, Kenya, and New Zealand advanced to the Super Sixes stage.

Teams who qualified for the Super Six stage only played against the teams from the other group; results against the other teams from the same group were carried forward to this stage.

Teams that advanced to the semi-finals are highlighted in green.

Source: Points Table

Semi finals

Bracket

Semi-final 1: Australia vs Sri Lanka
On a difficult, slow pitch at Port Elizabeth, Australia struggled their way to 212 (7 wickets, 50 overs) against tight Sri Lankan bowling, thanks mainly to a great innings from Andrew Symonds (91* from 118 balls, 7 fours, 1 six), demonstrating again captain Ricky Ponting's faith in him. Chaminda Vaas, continuing his excellent tournament, took three wickets. Australia's pace attack then ripped through the Sri Lankan top order, with Brett Lee (3/35 in 8 overs) taking three early wickets and Glenn McGrath (1/20 in 7 overs) taking one. By the time rain arrived in the 39th over, continued tight bowling had squeezed Sri Lanka to 123 (7 wickets, 38.1 overs), well behind the target given by the Duckworth–Lewis method. This is the match in which Adam Gilchrist famously "walked" despite being given not out.

Semi-final 2: India vs Kenya
The fairytale ended for the Kenyan team, the only non-Test-playing nation to ever make a World Cup semi-final. Sachin Tendulkar (83 from 101 balls, 5 fours, 1 six) and Sourav Ganguly (111 from 114 balls, 5 fours, 5 sixes), batted the Kenyans out of the game as India careered to a total of 270 (4 wickets, 50 overs). Under the Durban lights, the potent Indian seam attack of Zaheer Khan (3/14 in 9.2 overs), the experienced Javagal Srinath (1/11 in 7 overs) and Ashish Nehra (2/11 in 5 overs) careered through the Kenyan top order. Kenya were bowled out for 179 (all out, 46.2 overs), with only Steve Tikolo (56 from 83 balls, 5 fours, 2 sixes) putting up any significant resistance.

Final

India won the toss, and Ganguly, elected to field, hoping to take advantage of a pitch left damp by dew and rain. On a lively Wanderers Stadium pitch, the Australian openers took advantage of very wayward Indian opening bowlers to get off to a flying start. Adam Gilchrist (57 from 48 balls, 8 fours, 1 six) and Matthew Hayden (37 from 54 balls, 5 fours) shared an opening partnership of 105 runs in 14 overs, forcing Ganguly to bring on the spinners unusually early. The change of pace brought wickets with Adam Gilchrist, who had been swinging at everything, holing out off a sweep shot from the bowling of Harbhajan Singh. Matthew Hayden, looking somewhat better than he had throughout the tournament, soon followed for 37, leaving Australia at 2/125 Captain Ricky Ponting (140 from 121 balls, 4 fours, 8 sixes) and Damien Martyn (88 from 84 balls, 7 fours, 1 six) (playing with a broken thumb) completing a partnership of 234 runs in 30.1 overs, an Australian record for one-day cricket. Ponting and Martyn started efficiently, putting away bad balls but mostly keeping the scoring going with good running, then letting loose in the last ten overs, taking 109 from them. Ponting in particular dispatched the bowling over the fence with fearsome regularity in scoring 8 sixes, the most from one batsman in any World Cup match at the time. The final Australian total of 359 (2 wickets, 50 overs), at a run rate of 7.18 runs an over, was their then highest ever in ODI history.

India's run chase was made even more difficult after their best batsman, Sachin Tendulkar, was out in the first over after skying a pull shot, Glenn McGrath completing the caught and bowled. Nevertheless, Virender Sehwag's (82 from 81 balls, 10 fours, 3 sixes) run-a-ball half century gave India respectability as they maintained a high scoring rate. Their only realistic hope—a washout—looked a possibility as the game was interrupted by rain with India at 3/103 after 17 overs. However, this rain passed by, and India's hopes were dashed when Sehwag was run out by Darren Lehmann, and again when Rahul Dravid (47 from 57 balls, 2 fours) was bowled by Andy Bichel, ending their partnership of 88 runs in 13.2 overs. India's batsmen continued to throw wickets away in the chase as the run rate crept up past 7 an over, and they were finally bowled out for 234 (all out, 39.2 overs) at a run rate of 5.97 runs an over giving Australia an emphatic victory by a record margin (in World Cup finals thus far) of 125 runs, underlining their dominance of the tournament. Ponting was named "Man of the Match", and Sachin Tendulkar was named "Player of the Series."

Controversies

Security issues in Zimbabwe and Kenya
The security and political situation in Zimbabwe, and the appropriateness of playing there given the misdeeds of the regime of Robert Mugabe was a point of concern before the tournament. Two Zimbabwean players, Andy Flower and Henry Olonga wore black armbands in their opening game protesting against the nondemocratic rule in Zimbabwe. Both men subsequently retired from Zimbabwean cricket, and began playing overseas. England faced a great deal of domestic pressure to boycott their match in Zimbabwe on political grounds and did not play, citing fears for the players' safety. The boycott proved costly, as Zimbabwe advanced to the Super Sixes, just 2 points ahead of England, from the 4 points they achieved from the walkover. Similarly, New Zealand decided against playing in Kenya because of security fears which would ultimately cost New Zealand a semifinal spot.

Shane Warne's drug test
Australian star player Shane Warne was sent home from the cup in embarrassing circumstances, only the day before their opening game, after a positive drug test in a lead-up competition in Australia revealed that he had taken a banned diuretic. The leg spinner claimed that he had taken a 'fluid pill' on the advice of his mother.

References

External links

 Cricket World Cup 2003 at BBC Sport
 Cricket World Cup 2003 at ESPN Cricinfo
 Cricket World Cup 2003 at Guardian.co.uk Sport

 
World Cup
World Cup
World Cup
World Cup
Cricket World Cup tournaments
World Cup
World Cup
World Cup
Cricket World Cup
Cricket World Cup